Desert Heat is an Arab hip hop group from the United Arab Emirates. Formed in late 2002, Desert Heat consists of two Emirati brothers Salim Dahman and Abdullah Dahman.

Discography

Album: When The Desert Speaks

Track listing
Inta Wishlak
Waynkom
Narr
Jumeirah Thug
Keep It Desert
Dubai My City
Test Me
Terror Alert
When The Desert Speaks
Future Shock
Did You Know
Al Khatima
Fakkir
Arabi 4 Life
Under Her Feet

References

Emirati hip hop groups
Musical groups established in 2002
Emirati rappers
2002 establishments in the United Arab Emirates
Hip hop duos
Sibling musical duos